The 2021 Internazionali di Tennis Città di Perugia was a professional tennis tournament played on clay courts. It was the sixth edition of the tournament which was part of the 2021 ATP Challenger Tour. It took place in Perugia, Italy between 5 and 11 July 2021.

Singles main-draw entrants

Seeds

 1 Rankings are as of 28 June 2021.

Other entrants
The following players received wildcards into the singles main draw:
  Flavio Cobolli
  Francesco Forti
  Luca Vanni

The following players received entry from the qualifying draw:
  Nerman Fatić
  Francesco Passaro
  Timofey Skatov
  Giulio Zeppieri

Champions

Singles

  Tomás Martín Etcheverry def.  Vitaliy Sachko 7–5, 6–2.

Doubles

  Vitaliy Sachko /  Dominic Stricker def.  Tomás Martín Etcheverry /  Renzo Olivo 6–3, 5–7, [10–8].

References

Internazionali di Tennis Città di Perugia
2021
2021 in Italian tennis
July 2021 sports events in Italy